Gordi is a Wielingen-class frigate of the Bulgarian Navy with  number 43. She was originally commissioned as Westdiep in the Belgian Navy.

Construction and career
Westdiep was launched on 8 December 1975 at the Cockerill Yards in Hoboken, and christened by Princess Astrid of Belgium, on 20 January 1978. The patronage of the Westdiep was accepted by the city of Sint-Niklaas. Westdiep was the second ship in the Wielingen class. She had the pennant number F911.

On 5 October 2007 Westdiep, was withdrawn from service.

She was sold to the Bulgarian Navy together with her sister, Wielingen. Another sistership, Wandelaar has already been sold to Bulgaria. Westdiep entered service with them under the name Gordi, and with the pennant number 43.

References

External links
Information & pictures of the decommissioning and handover ceremony

Wielingen-class frigates
1975 ships
Gordi
Ships built in Belgium
Frigates of the Cold War